Rozhdestvenka is a rural locality (a village) in Michurinsky Selsoviet, Sharansky District, Bashkortostan, Russia. The population was 151 as of 2010. There are 2 streets.

Geography 
Rozhdestvenka is located 30 km northeast of Sharan (the district's administrative centre) by road. Tri Klyucha is the nearest rural locality.

References 

Rural localities in Sharansky District